Arivaca Junction is a census-designated place (CDP) in Pima County, Arizona, United States. The population was 1,090 at the 2010 census. As of July 1, 2015, it had an estimated population of 1,065.

Demographics

References

Census-designated places in Pima County, Arizona
Populated places in the Sonoran Desert